Colonel Levi G. Nutt (1866–1938) was the Chief of the Narcotics Division within the Prohibition Unit of the United States Department of the Treasury from 1919 to 1930, prior to the creation of the Federal Bureau of Narcotics.  He was a registered pharmacist, and led the Division to arrest of tens of thousands of drug addicts and dealers in the  1920s.  Nutt's son Rolland Nutt and son-in-law L. P. Mattingly were attorneys for racketeer Arnold Rothstein in tax matters.  After an investigation into the relationship in 1930, a grand jury found no criminal impairment of Narcotics Division activities, but Nutt lost his position as chief of the Narcotics Division.

Sources
 Mabry, Donald J. The Latin American Narcotics Trade and U.S. National Security. Greenwood Press: 1989.
 Pietrusza, David. Rothstein: The Life, Times, and Murder of the Criminal Genius Who Fixed the 1919 World Series. New York, Carroll & Graf: 2003.

External link

Nutt, L.G.
1866 births
1938 deaths